Sant'Anastasia may refer to:

 Sant'Anastasia, an Italian municipality in the Province of Naples
 Basilica di Sant'Anastasia al  Palatino, a church in Rome
 Sant'Anastasia (Verona), a church in Verona

See also
 Saint Anastasia (disambiguation)
 Anastasia (disambiguation)